The 2018 Étoile de Bessèges was a road cycling stage race that took place between 31 January and 4 February 2018. The race was rated as a 2.1 event as part of the 2018 UCI Europe Tour, and was the 48th edition of the Étoile de Bessèges cycling race. The race included five stages; the first four were road stages while the fifth and final stage was a  individual time trial.

Teams
Eighteen teams were invited to start the race. These included two UCI WorldTeams, twelve UCI Professional Continental teams and four UCI Continental teams.

Route

Stages

Stage 1
31 January 2018 — Bellegarde to Beaucaire,

Stage 2
1 February 2018 — Nîmes to Générac,

Stage 3
2 February 2018 — Bessèges to Bessèges,

Stage 4
3 February 2018 — Chusclan to Laudun-l'Ardoise,

Stage 5
4 February 2017 — Alès to Alès, individual time trial (ITT)

References

External links
 

Etoile de Besseges
Etoile de Besseges
2018